John Davies (13 November 1787 – 27 April 1855) was a Welsh (Glamorganshire) stone mason, and a composer. He began his career as a stone-mason, notoriously working by both day and night. He had been taught to play the dulcimer by a lodger at the age of about fourteen, but it was not until he was about thirty that he seriously began to study music, becoming both a performer and a composer.

His works include a number of anthems and hymn tunes, such as "Gethsemane" (Lleuad yr Oes, 1827), which was arranged by Rowland Huw Pritchard.

He died in 1855 in Llanelli, and was buried in Mynydd-bach cemetery.

References

1787 births
1855 deaths
19th-century Welsh musicians
19th-century British composers
Welsh classical composers
Welsh male classical composers
19th-century British male musicians